Phenyllithium or lithobenzene is an organometallic agent with the empirical formula C6H5Li. It is most commonly used as a metalating agent in organic syntheses and a substitute for Grignard reagents for introducing phenyl groups in organic syntheses. Crystalline phenyllithium is colorless; however, solutions of phenyllithium are various shades of brown or red depending on the solvent used and the impurities present in the solute.

Preparation
Phenyllithium was first produced by the reaction of lithium metal with diphenylmercury:

(C6Η5)2Ηg + 2Li → 2C6Η5Li + Ηg

Reaction of a phenyl halide with lithium metal produces phenyllithium:
X-Ph + 2Li → Ph-Li + LiX

Phenyllithium can also be synthesized with a metal-halogen exchange reaction:

n-BuLi + X-Ph → n-BuX + Ph-Li

The predominant method of producing phenyllithium today are the latter two syntheses.

Reactions
The primary use of PhLi is to facilitate formation of carbon-carbon bonds by nucleophilic addition and substitution reactions:

PhLi + R2C=O → PhR2COLi

2-Phenylpyridine is prepared by the reaction of phenyl lithium with pyridine, a process that entails an addition-elimination pathway:
C6H5Li + C5H5N → C6H5-C5H4N + LiH

Structure and properties

Phenyllithium is an organolithium compound that forms monoclinic crystals. Solid phenyllithium can be described as consisting of dimeric Li2Ph2 subunits. The Li atoms and the ipso carbons of the phenyl rings form a planar four-membered ring. The plane of the phenyl groups are perpendicular to the plane of this Li2C2 ring. Additional strong intermolecular bonding occurs between these phenyllithium dimers and the π-electrons of the phenyl groups in the adjacent dimers, resulting in an infinite polymeric ladder structure.

In solution, it takes a variety of structures dependent on the organic solvent. In tetrahydrofuran, it equilibrates between monomer and dimer states. In ether, as it is commonly sold, phenyllithium exists as a tetramer. Four Li atoms and four ipso carbon centers occupy alternating vertices of a distorted cube. Ph

The C–Li bond lengths are an average of 2.33 Å. An ether molecule binds to each of the Li sites through its oxygen atom. In the presence of LiBr, a byproduct of directly reacting lithium with a phenyl halide, the [(PhLi•Et2O)4] complex instead becomes [(PhLi•Et2O)3•LiBr). The Li atom of LiBr occupies one of the lithium sites in the cubane-type cluster and Br atom sits in an adjacent carbon site.

References

Organolithium compounds
Phenyl compounds